Sidney Lumet was an American film director, producer, and screenwriter. 

Lumet's most known films include, the courtroom drama 12 Angry Men (1957), the holocaust drama The Pawnbroker (1964), the Cold War thriller Fail Safe (1964), the crime dramas Serpico (1973), and Dog Day Afternoon (1975) as well as the satirical news drama Network (1976), the psychological drama Equus (1977), the legal drama The Verdict (1982), and the crime thriller Before the Devil Knows You're Dead (2007).

Film

Director

As an actor
...One Third of a Nation... (1939) 
The Manchurian Candidate (2004)

Uncredited
King: A Filmed Record... Montgomery to Memphis (1970)

Sources: Turner Classic Movies & Internet Movie Database

Television

Theatre

As an actor

As a director

Source: Playbill & Internet Broadway Database

References 

Lumet, Sidney